"Me Too" is a song co-written and recorded by American country music singer Toby Keith. It was released on November 18, 1996 as the third and final single from his album Blue Moon.  The song reached the top of the Billboard Hot Country Singles & Tracks chart.  Keith wrote the song with Chuck Cannon.

Content
The song is a romantic ballad from the perspective of a man who regularly struggles with saying the phrase "I love you" to his significant other, and instead performs physical tasks as a way of showing his affection to her. The only easy way for him to utter that phrase is by simply telling her "me too" after she says "I love you" to him first, hoping she will understand that means he is in agreement with what she just told him.

Critical reception
Deborah Evans Price, of Billboard magazine reviewed the song favorably, saying that it is a song that a lot of men will relate to. She goes on to say that Keith "turns in a smooth believable performance."

Music video
This was the last Toby Keith video that Marc Ball directed, who has been directed Toby Keith videos since 1993. It premiered on CMT on January 12, 1997, when CMT named it a "Hot Shot". This is the first video in which Toby does not wear a cowboy hat, rather a full head of hair.

Chart positions
"Me Too" debuted at number 72 on the U.S. Billboard Hot Country Singles & Tracks for the week of November 23, 1996.

Year-end charts

References

1996 singles
Toby Keith songs
Songs written by Chuck Cannon
Songs written by Toby Keith
A&M Records singles
1996 songs